Thomas Rathsack is a lecturer and former member of the Danish Jaeger Corps.

He served with the Royal Life Guards as a sergeant before getting accepted into the Jaeger Corps in 1990. After retiring from the army he worked as a photographer and IT specialist. He reenlisted after the September 11 attacks.

He writes about his experiences in Iraq and Afghanistan in his book Jæger – i krig med eliten (Jaeger: At War with Denmark's Elite Special Forces), which was widely talked about and criticized.

In 2017, he featured in a TV2-produced show which put 30 men through Jaegor Corps-like physical tests.

References

External links 
 Jæger – i krig med eliten at WikiLeaks

1967 births
Danish military personnel
Living people